Pemafibrate, marketed as Parmodia, is a peroxisome proliferator-activated receptor alpha (PPARα) agonist. It is developed and marketed by Kowa Pharmaceuticals.

On 3 July 2017, Pharmaceuticals and Medical Devices Agency approved it in Japan. It is available in 0.1 mg tablets.

References

Fibrates
Benzoxazoles